The 345th Guards Airborne Regiment (345th PPD) of the Soviet Airborne Forces, and after 1992, the Russian Airborne Forces, was active from 1944 to 1998.

History

It was formed on 30 December 1944 at Lapichi, Osipovichi district, Mogilev Oblast, in the Byelorussian SSR. In 1979, after the disbandment of 105th Guards Vienna Airborne Division it received a Separate Regiment designation (345th OPPD).

Originally, the regiment was a part of 105th Guards Rifle Division, which then became 105th Guards Airborne Division stationed at Fergana in the Uzbek SSR.

The regiment was attached to 40th Army (Soviet Union) headquartered in Kabul, serving in Afghanistan from the earliest days of the conflict, arriving on 14 December 1979. During the Regiment's deployment in Afghanistan, its original 1st Battalion remained on station in Fergana, Uzbek SSR, and in 1982 became the base for formation of the 387th Training Regiment.

An Airborne Battalion, which arrived in Afghanistan in July 1979 under the command of Guards Lieutenant Colonel Lomakin, was integrated into the 345th regiment as its new 1st Battalion. In October 1979, an incident resulting in death of KGB officer Captain Chepurnoy had occurred in this battalion, leading to transfer of command to Guards Major Pustovit.

87 troops of a company of the 345th Regiment took part in Operation Storm-333.

The 345th Airborne Regiment had participated in most major operations of the conflict, including the Battle for Hill 3234, which became the basis for the script of the film The 9th Company. On or about 11 February 1989 the regiment withdrew from Afghanistan making it one of the last detachments to exit the country.

After Afghanistan

After the withdrawal from Afghanistan, the regiment became part of 104th Guards Airborne Division.
The Regiment was later relocated to Gudauta in the Abkhaz ASSR of the Georgian SSR. It took part in the April 9, 1989, crack-down on demonstrators in the centre of Tbilisi. Since August 1992 it was stationed in Gudauta Abkhaz ASSR to participate in the Abkhaz war. It was subsequently renamed the 50th Military Base and then the 10th Peacekeeping Airborne Regiment.

References

External links
 345th Independent Guards Airborne Regiment official web site 
 Uniforms and History of the 345 PDP in Afghanistan

Military units and formations established in 1944
345
Airborne units and formations of the Soviet Union
Airborne units and formations of Russia
Military units and formations awarded the Order of the Red Banner